Dr. Albert Littlefield was the first professional abortion provider in Portland, Oregon. Dr. Edgar Stewart inherited his practice, which he closed in the 1940s in favor of Ruth Barnett.

References

American abortion providers
Physicians from Portland, Oregon
Year of death missing
Year of birth missing